The Simd, is an Ossetian folk group dance. Time signature 4/4, 2/4. The beauty of Simd is in the strict graphic outline of the dance, the contrast between black and white costumes, the softness of movements, the strictness of line formations, and the harmony created by all of the above. 

In South Ossetia there is the State song and dance ensemble “Simd”.

See also 
 Georgian dance

References

External links 
Sites
 State song and dance ensemble of South Ossetia “Simd” 
 Симд
 Симд — танец, корнями уходящий в глубокую древность
 Симд (песня, сопровождающая танец).
 Осетинская хореография.
 Уарзиати В. С. Танцы // Народные игры и развлечения осетин. — Орджоникидзе, 1987.
 Симд Нартов. Массовый танец.
 Культура.
 Народные осетинский танец. Специальный материал.
Videos 
 Simd performed by ensemble “Alan” (statement of Elbrus Kubalov, 2011). 
 Simd performed by ensemble “Simd” (statement of Aslanbeg Kabisov, 1989).
 Simd performed by ensemble “Gorets” (statement of Yuri Alborov, 2010). 
 Simd performed by ensemble “Alan” and “Gorets” (statement of Khadzhismel Varziev, 2010). 
 Simd (an episode from a film “Fatima”, 1958).
 Narton-simd in the Rekom Sanctuary, 2010.

Group dances
Ossetian music
Ossetian culture
Dance
Music of the Caucasus
Ossetia